Chenette is a surname. Notable people with the surname include:

Emily Chenette, American biochemist
Justin Chenette (born 1991), American politician

Surnames of French origin